Perham Municipal Airport  is a city-owned public-use airport located two miles northwest of the central business district of Perham, a city in Otter Tail County, Minnesota, United States.

Facilities and aircraft 
Perham Municipal Airport covers an area of 80 acres which contains one runway designated 13/31 with a  asphalt surface. For the 12-month period ending May 31, 2011, the airport had 7,200 aircraft operations, an average of 20 per day: 100% general aviation. At that time there were 16 aircraft based at this airport: 12 single-engine, 1 multi engine, 2 helicopters, and 1 ultralight.

References

External links 
 

Airports in Minnesota
Buildings and structures in Otter Tail County, Minnesota
Transportation in Otter Tail County, Minnesota